Ivaylo Dimitrov (born 26 June 1987 in Plovdiv) is a Bulgarian former footballer who played as a right back.

Career
Born in Plovdiv, Dimitrov started to play football in local club Spartak. In June 2006, he signed first professional contract with the club. After one very good season with Spartak in Bulgarian second division Dimitrov signed with Lokomotiv Sofia. He established himself as a regular for the team during the 2010–11 season.

In January 2017 Dimitrov announced his retirement from football.

References

External links

Bulgarian footballers
1987 births
Living people
First Professional Football League (Bulgaria) players
FC Spartak Plovdiv players
FC Lokomotiv 1929 Sofia players
Botev Plovdiv players
PFC Lokomotiv Plovdiv players
PFC Chernomorets Burgas players
FC Oborishte players
Association football defenders
Association football midfielders